Robyn Smith is an American retired jockey.

Robyn Smith may refer to:

Robyn Smith (sports administrator), Australian sports administrator
Robyn Smith (cartoonist), Jamaican cartoonist

See also
 Robin Smith (disambiguation)